Musk is an upcoming documentary film directed by Alex Gibney. Jigsaw Productions is producing the film alongside Closer Media, Anonymous Content, and Double Agent.

Synopsis
The documentary is reported to be a "definite and unvarnished examination" of businessman Elon Musk.

Production
Gibney revealed in March 2023 that he had started work on the documentary and was “many months” into the production. Joining Gibney in producing the documentary are Jessie Deeter for Jigsaw Productions, Dana O’Keefe for Double Agent, Joey Marra and Zhang Xin for Closer Media, with Anonymous Content’s Nick Shumaker and Jessica Grimshaw. Elon Musk responded to the report of the documentary in production by using his Twitter account to express that it would probably be “a hit-piece”. Gibney himself responded by asking “how would you know?” via his Twitter account.

References

Upcoming films
Films directed by Alex Gibney